The 1977 Duke Blue Devils football team represented Duke University during the 1977 NCAA Division I football season.

Schedule

References

Duke
Duke Blue Devils football seasons
Duke Blue Devils football